The Sun is the star at the center of the Solar System.

Sun or Sunn may also refer to:
 Sunlight
 Sun, an abbreviation for Sunday
 An Adjective; Sunny

Places
 SUN, ISO-3166-1 code for the Soviet Union
 Sun, West Virginia, USA; an unincorporated community
 Sun Glacier, a glacier in Greenland

Companies
 Sunoco, known as Sun Company, Sun Oil Company, or variations from 1890 to 1998
 Sun Cellular, a telecommunications provider
 Sun Microsystems, a former computer company
 Sun Finance, a Latvian company
 Sun Group, an Indian conglomerate
 Sun Media, a large Canadian media company
 Sun (St. Paul's Churchyard), a historical bookseller in London
 Sun Orthodontix
 Sun Television and Appliances
 Sun TV Network, Chennai, India
 Sunwoda Electronic, chinese r&d, design, manufacturer of lithium-ion battery cell and module

Literature 
 Sun Newspapers, a chain of weekly newspapers in Ohio
 List of newspapers named Sun
 List of newspapers named Daily Sun
 Sun, a book of poetry by Michael Palmer

Music

Artists 
 Sun (German band), an alternative rock group
 Sun (R&B band), an American group
 Ho Yeow Sun or Sun (born 1972), Singaporean Christian pop music singer
 Joe Sun (1943–2019), born James Joseph Paulsen, American country music singer-songwriter
 Silver Sun or Sun, a British power pop band
 Sun, an Australian group featuring drummer Oren Ambarchi
 Something Unto Nothing (S.U.N.), a band project formed by Brian Tichy
Sunn (born Hwang Ji-won, 2000), formerly known as Viva, member of South Korean girl group Good Day and cignature

Albums 
 Sun (Cat Power album)
 Sun (Nopsajalka album)
 Sun (Thomas Bergersen album)

Songs 
 "Sun" (Belinda Carlisle song) (2013)
 "Sun" (Live song)
 "Sun" (Two Door Cinema Club song) (2012)
 "Sun", a 1989 song by Concrete Blond from Free
 "SUN", a 2012 song by Mouse on Mars from WOW

Record labels 
 Sun Records
 Sun Records (jazz)

Stage and screen
 Sun (film), a 1929 Italian drama directed by Alessandro Blasetti

Television stations and networks
 Sun News (India), a 24-hour Tamil news channel 
 Sun News Network, a defunct Canadian news channel
 Sun Sports, an American television network
 Sun Television, a Japanese television station
 SUN TV (Canada), former Toronto TV station
 Sun TV (India), a Tamil-language regional cable-television station
 INews, previously known as SUN TV, an Indonesian station
 WSUN (FM), a radio station (97.1 FM) licensed to Holiday, Florida, United States
 WSUN-TV, a defunct television station (channel 38) in St. Petersburg, Florida, United States
 WSUN (defunct), a radio station in Tampa Bay Area, Florida, United States known as WSUN from 1927 until 2001

Sports
 Connecticut Sun, a professional women's basketball team
 Gold Coast Suns, a professional Australian rules football club
 Phoenix Suns, a professional men's basketball team

Transportation
 Sun (motorcycle)
 Sun-class cruise ship
 GWR Sun Class, a class of locomotives
 Sunderland station's National Rail code
 Sunny Bay station's MTR code
 Friedman Memorial Airport's IATA code

People
 Sun Ra (1914–1993), American jazz musician
 Sun (surname), a Chinese surname and list of people with the surname
 Sun Tzu (disambiguation)
 Sun Yat-sen (1866–1925), Chinese Politician and revolutionary martyr
 Sun Myung Moon (1920–2012), Korean founder of the Unification Church

Fictional characters
 Mr. Sun, a Ni Hao Kai Lan character

Other uses
 Sun (heraldry), representations of the Sun as heraldic charges
 Seconda Università degli Studi di Napoli, a university in Italy
 Soul of the Ultimate Nation, an online role-playing game
 SU(n), the special unitary group of degree n, a concept in mathematics
 Cun (unit) or sun, a unit of length

See also

 Sol (disambiguation)
 Son (disambiguation)
 Sonne (disambiguation)
 Sun FM (disambiguation)
 The Sun (disambiguation)